Smilosuchus (meaning "chisel crocodile") is an extinct genus of leptosuchomorph parasuchid from the Late Triassic of North America.

History
 
The type species was first described in 1995 as a replacement generic name for Leptosuchus gregorii. Because of the large rostral crest it possessed, it was considered to be distinct enough from other species of Leptosuchus (all of which had smaller and more restricted crests) to be within its own genus. Some studies seem to suggest that Smilosuchus is congeneric with Leptosuchus, as the enlarged crest could have been independently developed in Leptosuchus. However, newer studies support the idea that Smilosuchus is distinct from the type species of Leptosuchus, Leptosuchus crosbiensis. Phylogenetic analyses suggest that Smilosuchus is more closely related to mystriosuchins than to Leptosuchus species.

Description 
 
Like all phytosaurs, Smilosuchus had the nostrils close to the top of its head. The rostral crest and nasal bulge supporting these raised nostrils was larger in Smilosuchus than in many other phytosaurs. The jaws are very short and broad and the teeth are heterodont, with large tusks at the anterior of the mouth for impaling prey and more blade-like teeth for slicing flesh closer to the back of the mouth. The tusks are mounted on a bulge at the tip of the snout present in nearly all phytosaurs. Its squamosal processes are short and deep, indicating a powerful bite. This coupled with its large size (it is one of the largest known phytosaurs) suggests that it hunted large prey such as Placerias.

Phylogeny
Below is a cladogram from Stocker (2012):

References
 

Phytosaurs
Prehistoric reptile genera
Late Triassic reptiles of North America
Fossil taxa described in 1995